Rose Victoria Williams is an English actress from Ealing, London. She is best known for her work as Princess Claude in Reign and as Charlotte Heywood in Sanditon.

Early life and education
Williams was born in Ealing, West London on the 18th February 1994. Her mother worked as a costume designer and her father as a gardener.

Her first job was at a clothing store in Dover Street Market when she was 17 years old. She studied fashion and decided at the age of 18 to pursue acting.

Career
Williams appeared in Casualty, Reign, Medici, and Curfew, before appearing in Changeland with Seth Green and Macaulay Culkin.

Williams plays the lead in the 2019 Andrew Davies adaptation of Sanditon, the unfinished novel by Jane Austen. Her role in Reign required her to be based in Toronto for three years, during which time she visited Los Angeles frequently.

Williams had the lead role in British horror film The Power, also starring Emma Rigby, about a nurse in 1970’s London. Williams also has a supporting role in the film adaptation Mrs. Harris Goes to Paris starring Lesley Manville.

Filmography

Film

Television

References

External links
 

Living people
21st-century English actresses
Actresses from London
English film actresses
English television actresses
People from Ealing
1994 births